Murray Hugh Matthewson MB ChB (NZ) 1967, FRCS (Eng) 1973, MA (Cantab) 1985. (17 September 1944 – 3 August 2018) was an orthopaedic surgeon who specialised in the spine and hand. Recipient of The Gordon Taylor Prize, he was an examiner for The Royal College of Surgeons as well as a Life Fellow of Hughes Hall, University of Cambridge, Associate Lecturer in the Faculty of Clinical Medicine, University of Cambridge and president of the British Society for Surgery of the Hand 2003. He was Orthopaedic Surgeon to Cambridge University Rugby Club 1998–2005.

References 

1944 births
2018 deaths
New Zealand orthopaedic surgeons
New Zealand emigrants to the United Kingdom
Fellows of Hughes Hall, Cambridge
University of Otago alumni
People from Wellington City